Allahabadi cake (Nastaleeq: ,) is a traditional Indian rum fruit cake originating and lending its name from the north Indian city of Allahabad. Allahabadi cake is a Christmas cake popularly prepared for consumption during Christmastide by the Christian population of India and Pakistan.

Preparation 
Allahabadi cake is made with maida, eggs, clarified butter, sugar, petha, marmalade, nuts, ginger and fennel as its main ingredients. Dry fruits and nuts are soaked in rum for enhanced flavour.

See also

References

Uttar Pradeshi cuisine
Allahabad culture
Foods with alcoholic drinks
Christmas cakes
Butter cakes